USS Kite may refer to the following ships of the United States Navy:

 , was purchased by the US Navy 11 September 1940 and was sold 2 March 1945
  was canceled during construction 12 August 1945
 , was launched 17 February 1944 and transferred to the South Korean Navy 6 January 1956

United States Navy ship names